Donat of the Order of Saint John is a distinction awarded by the Order of Saint John. Any person not being a Member of the Venerable Order of St. John who from an appreciation of the objects or work of the Order makes a worthy contribution to its funds or to the funds of a Priory may be appointed by the Grand Prior, on the recommendation of the Grand Council, a Donat of the Order; or by the Prior of a Priory, on the recommendation of his Priory Chapter, to be a Donat of the Priory and thereafter his name shall be recorded in the List of Donats of the Order which shall be maintained by the Secretary-General or as the case may be in the List of Donats of the Priory which shall be maintained by the proper officer of the Priory.

The rights and privileges of a Donat of a Priory shall in all respects be the same as those of a Donat of the Order. The appointment of a Donat shall lapse and his name shall be deleted from the List of Donats if he shall subsequently be admitted as a Member of the Order in any Grade.

The Donat's Badge is the Badge of the Order without the upper arm. A woman who is appointed a Donat suspends her Badge from a bow.

Donats of the Order have included:

See also
 List of the priors of St John of Jerusalem in England
 Museum of the Order of St John
 Service Medal of the Order of St John
 Order of Saint John (Bailiwick of Brandenburg)
 Sovereign Military Order of Malta
 List of Grand Crosses of the Order of St John

External links 

The Most Venerable Order of St John
The St John of Jerusalem Eye Hospital Group

Order of Saint John (chartered 1888)